Favartia macgintyi, common name : McGinty's Murex, is an extinct species of sea snail, a marine gastropod mollusk in the family Muricidae, the murex snails or rock snails.

Description
The shell size varies between 13.4 mm and 44 mm

Fossil range
The real Favartia macgintyi is a late Pliocene and early Pleistocene fossil from the Caloosahatchee formation of southern Florida. The Recent Florida species that has been designated by that name is still unnamed according to Petuch (2013: 199)

Distribution
This species occurs in the Caribbean Sea, the Gulf of Mexico and in the Atlantic Ocean from Florida and the Bahamas to Northeastern Brazil.

References

 Garrigues B. & Lamy D. (2019). Inventaire des Muricidae récoltés au cours de la campagne MADIBENTHOS du MNHN en Martinique (Antilles Françaises) et description de 12 nouvelles espèces des genres Dermomurex, Attilosa, Acanthotrophon, Favartia, Muricopsis et Pygmaepterys (Mollusca, Gastropoda). Xenophora Taxonomy. 23: 22–59.

External links
 
 Smith M. (1938). Further notes upon Tertiary and Recent mollusks from Florida together with descriptions of new species [concluded]. The Nautilus. 51: 88-91

Muricidae
Gastropods described in 1938